Bad Night for the Blues is a 15-minute comedy film written and directed by Chris Shepherd and produced by Maria Manton. First transmitted on the BBC on 27 February 2011 and later in France on 2 April 2011 as a part of Mickrocine on Canal+ Cinecinema. Other countries to transmit the film include Spain, Italy  and Africa. It is the last film to be made by production company Slinky Pictures.

Based on a real-life event. Chris takes his Aunty to her local Conservative Club for Christmas party only to find his Aunty has a grudge with another club member Elizabeth. As the night unfolds Chis has trouble controlling his Aunty as the night descends further into  embarrassing conflict.

Awards

2011
Winner of International Canal+ Award at Clermont Ferrand International Film Festival.

UK Film Council and BBC Film Network presents a Slinky Pictures production made in association with vision+media.

External links
 
 
 http://www.chrisshepherdfilms.com

2010 films
2010s English-language films
2010 comedy films
British comedy short films
2010 short films
2010s British films